Child cannibalism or fetal cannibalism is the act of eating a child or fetus.

Ritual practice accusations

Historical accounts
According to 14th century traveller Odoric of Pordenone, who gave an account of a place called Lamuri (the account was later borrowed by Sir John Mandeville's in his Book of Marvels and Travels), describing the people Lamuri as cannibals who purchased children from merchants to slaughter them.

Modern cases

China 
The performance artist Zhu Yu claimed that he prepared, cooked and ate real human bodies, including fetuses, as an artistic performance. The performance was called Eating People, and he claimed it was to protest against cannibalism. It was intended as "shock art". The Chinese Ministry of Culture cited a menace to social order and the spiritual health of the Chinese people, banned exhibitions involving culture, animal abuse, corpses, and overt violence and sexuality and Zhu Yu was prosecuted for his deeds.

Snopes and other urban legend sites have said the "fetus" used by Zhu Yu was most likely constructed from a duck's body and a doll head. Other images from another art exhibit were falsely circulated along with Zhu Yu's photographs and claimed to be evidence of fetus soup.

Critics see the propagation of these rumors as a form of blood libel, or accusing one's enemy of eating children, and accuse countries of using this as a political lever.

Capsule pills purported to be filled with human baby flesh in the form of powder were seized by South Koreans from ethnic Koreans living in China, who had tried to smuggle them into South Korea and consume the capsules themselves or distribute them to other ethnic Korean citizens of China living in South Korea. Experts later suggested that the pills had actually been made of newborn placenta for the documented practice of human placentophagy.

Satire
Jonathan Swift's 1729 satiric article "A Modest Proposal for Preventing the Children of Poor People in Ireland from Being a Burden to Their Parents or Country, and for Making Them Beneficial to the Public" proposed the utilization of an economic system based on poor people selling their children to be eaten, claiming that this would benefit the economy, family values, and general happiness of Ireland. The target of Swift's satire is the rationalism of modern economics, and the growth of rationalistic modes of thinking at the expense of more traditional human values.

See also
Albert Fish
Child sacrifice
Filial cannibalism
Human placentophagy
Saturn Devouring His Son
Kindlifresserbrunnen
 Traditional Chinese medicines derived from the human body

References

External links
Photos in South-Korean newspaper
Italian Asian article
Urban legends website
LJ News

Cannibalism
Child murder